Hasab El-Rasoul Omer Ali nicknamed Hasabu El-Sagheir (born 1 July 1947) is a Sudanese footballer. He competed in the men's tournament at the 1972 Summer Olympics.

Hounors

Clubs
Burri SC
Sudan Premier League 
Champion (1) : 1968

Nationalteam
Sudan national football team
African Cup of Nations
 Champion (1) : 1970
Pan Arab Games
 Runner-up (1) 1965

Internationalgoals

References

External links
 

1947 births
Living people
People from Khartoum
Sudanese footballers
Sudan international footballers
Olympic footballers of Sudan
Footballers at the 1972 Summer Olympics
1970 African Cup of Nations players
1972 African Cup of Nations players
Africa Cup of Nations-winning players
Place of birth missing (living people)
Association football forwards